This is a list of Star Trek: The Next Generation novels based on the American science fiction television series of the same name. The book line is published by Simon & Schuster's imprints Pocket Books, Pocket Star, Atria, and Gallery.

More recent Next Generation novels tie-in to other Star Trek book lines and series, such as: Titan (2005–2017), Destiny (2008), Typhon Pact (2010–2012), and The Fall (2013–14).

Novelizations

Episode novelizations 
Based on select episodes from the television series.

Film novelizations 
Based on the Next Generation film series.

Young adult film novelizations 
Film novelizations intended for younger readers.

Numbered novels 
Numbered paperback releases:

Original novels 
Includes hardcover and paperback releases:

Young adult novels 
Star Trek: The Next GenerationStarfleet Academy young adult series explores the lives of the  crew as Starfleet Academy cadets. The Best and the Brightest (1998), by Susan Wright, is thematically similar. Starfleet Academy (1997), a video game novelization by Diane Carey, is unrelated. Novellas written by Peter David tie into New Frontier (1997–2015).

Omnibus editions 
Collections of novels from the Next Generation book line.

Miniseries

Q Continuum (1998) 
Star Trek: The Next GenerationThe Q Continuum miniseries explores the life of Q prior to his introduction in the episode "Encounter at Farpoint". An omnibus edition was published in 2003 as part of the Signature Edition series.

Double Helix (1999) 
Star Trek: The Next GenerationDouble Helix crossover miniseries was inspired by the film Outbreak (1995). Created by John J. Ordover and Michael Jan Friedman. An omnibus edition was published in 2002.

Genesis Wave (2000–2003) 
Star Trek: The Next GenerationThe Genesis Wave miniseries follows the crew of the Enterprise as they attempt to prevent the weaponization of the Genesis Device.

Maximum Warp (2001) 
Star Trek: The Next GenerationMaximum Warp miniseries follows the crew of the Enterprise as they search for a solution to a disruption in subspace which prevents warp travel. The titles do not appear on the cover art, only the series name and book number.

A Time to... (2004) 
Star Trek: A Time to... crossover miniseries explores events prior to Nemesis (2002). Conceived by John J. Ordover, and edited by Keith DeCandido. Originally intended to be a sequence of twelve novels. Not all printings include a number stamp.

Slings and Arrows (2007–08) 
Star Trek: The Next GenerationSlings and Arrows miniseries explores events between Generations (1994) and First Contact (1996). Published as ebook exclusives.

Cold Equations (2012) 
Star Trek: The Next GenerationCold Equations relaunch miniseries explores the effect artificial life has on Starfleet and the Federation.

Short story collections 
Collections featuring characters and settings from the Next Generation.

Relaunch novels 
Interlinked novels set after the film Nemesis (2002):

See also 
 List of Star Trek novels

Notes

References

External links 
 
 

Book series introduced in 1987
 
 
 
Lists of novels based on works